George H. Pritchard was an American football, basketball, and baseball coach and college athletic administrator. He served as the head football coach Oklahoma Methodist University—now known as Oklahoma City University—from 1913 to 1914, Eureka College in Eureka, Illinois from 1917 to 1919, Drury College—now known as Drury University—in Springfield, Missouri from 1920 to 1923, and Hiram College in Hiram, Ohio from 1924 to 1927. In 1932, Pritchard was named athletic director at Southeast Missouri State Teachers College—now known as Southeast Missouri State University.

References

Year of birth missing
Year of death missing
Drury Panthers football coaches
Drury Panthers men's basketball coaches
Eureka Red Devils football coaches
Eureka Red Devils men's basketball coaches
Hiram Terriers baseball coaches
Hiram Terriers football coaches
Hiram Terriers men's basketball coaches
Oklahoma City Chiefs football coaches
Southeast Missouri State Redhawks athletic directors